Mike Estep (born July 19, 1949) is a former professional tennis player from the United States.

During his career Estep won 2 singles titles and 7 doubles titles. He achieved a career-high singles ranking of World No. 59 in August 1973.

In 1983 until 1986 he coached Martina Navratilova. Later he worked with Carling Bassett, Hana Mandlíková,  Jana Novotná and Arantxa Sánchez Vicario.

He was a board member of the Association of Tennis Professionals from 1982 to 1989, holding the position of chairman of the ATP ranking Committee at the same time. He also worked with the U.S. Tennis Association, creating a method for ranking juniors in 1999 that is now used nationwide, and serving on the junior development council for Texas from 1993 to 1995.

Estep resides in Hurst, Texas.

Early life
Estep grew up in Dallas, where he graduated from the St. Mark's School of Texas. As a junior tennis player, Estep held a No 1 national ranking for five straight years (from 1963 to 1967). Estep was named the Texas High School Player of the Year, and led the U.S. to the Sunshine Cup Title and played on the U.S. Junior Davis Cup Team. When Estep and George Taylor won the USTA national junior doubles tournament, they became the first team of Texans to win a national tennis championship. .

College tennis 

At Rice University, Estep was an All American tennis player for three years. As a senior in 1970, he won the Southwest Conference titles in both singles and doubles. At the NCAA Division 1 annual tournament, Estep was an NCAA doubles semifinalist (1968), a singles finalist (1969), and a singles semifinalist (1970). He graduated from Rice with a degree in political science.

Grand Prix and WCT finals

Singles: 4 (2 titles, 2 runner-ups)

Doubles: 16 (7 titles, 9 runner-ups)

Coaching
Estep entered coaching after retiring from competitive tennis in 1983.

He is best known for coaching Martina Navratilova during her rise to dominance.

References

External links
 
 
 Ultimate Tennis Statistics

American male tennis players
People from Dallas
People from Hurst, Texas
Rice Owls men's tennis players
Tennis people from Texas
1949 births
Living people